The Dead Sea toothcarp (Aphanius dispar richardsoni) is a subspecies of the Arabian toothcarp that is endemic to the Dead Sea basin, although molecular evidence suggests that it should be regarded as a species. It is threatened by water fluctuation, and the introduction of cichlids and Gambusia. The sub-specific name of this fish honours the Scottish surgeon and naturalist John Richardson (naturalist) (1787-1865) who first reported killifish in the Dead Sea basin.
The Dead Sea toothcarp  -- has been on the red list of the International Union for Conversation of Nature since 2014.

The IUCN warns that the "exploitation of spring waters and climate change" are major threats facing the four-centimetre-long, silver-coloured fish.

References

Aphanius
Endangered fish
Fish described in 1907